Oosterheem is a RandstadRail station in Zoetermeer, the Netherlands.

History

The station opened on 29 October 2006, as part of the Oosterheemlijn (Seghwaert - Javalaan). The station is on a viaduct along the Loirestroom at the junction with Moldaustroom.

Train services
The following services currently call at Oosterheem:

Gallery

RandstadRail stations in Zoetermeer
Railway stations opened in 2006